Sigvard I. Sivertsen (27 February 1881 – 27 December 1963) was a Norwegian gymnast who competed in the 1908 Summer Olympics and in the 1912 Summer Olympics.

As a member of the Norwegian team, he won a silver medal in the gymnastics team event in 1908. Four years later he was part of the Norwegian team, which won the gold medal in the gymnastics men's team, free system event.

He was born and died in Bergen, and represented Bergens TF.

References

1881 births
1963 deaths
Norwegian male artistic gymnasts
Gymnasts at the 1908 Summer Olympics
Gymnasts at the 1912 Summer Olympics
Olympic gymnasts of Norway
Olympic gold medalists for Norway
Olympic silver medalists for Norway
Sportspeople from Bergen
Olympic medalists in gymnastics

Medalists at the 1912 Summer Olympics
Medalists at the 1908 Summer Olympics
20th-century Norwegian people